Last Train to Freo is a 2006 Australian film based on Reg Cribb's 2001 play The Return, and directed by Jeremy Sims.

Synopsis
Two thugs from the Perth suburb of Midland catch the last train to Fremantle. When a young woman, unaware that the train guards are on strike, boards the train several stops later, the thugs are interested by her. After two othersan older woman and a silent manboard the train, it becomes apparent that not everybody on the train is who they appear to be.

Cast
Steve Le Marquand – the Tall Thug
Tom Budge – Trev
Gigi Edgley – Lisa
Glenn Hazeldine – Simon
Gillian Jones – Maureen
Lisa Hensley – voice of train announcer
Reg Cribb – man on platform

Awards
2006 Australian Film Institute
 Best Lead Actor – Steve Le Marquand – nomination
 Best Screenplay – Adapted – Reg Cribb – nomination
 Best Supporting Actor – Tom Budge – nomination

Film Critics Circle of Australia Awards
 Best Actor in a Lead Role – Steve Le Marquand – nomination
 Best Actor in a Supporting Role – Tom Budge – nomination
 Best Actress in a Lead Role – Gigi Edgley – nomination
 Best Actress in a Supporting Role – Gillian Jones – nomination
 Best Screenplay – Adapted – Reg Cribb – nomination

Box office
Last Train to Freo grossed $102,726 at the box office in Australia.

See also
 Cinema of Australia

References

External links

2006 films
Australian drama films
2006 drama films
Rail transport films
Films set in Western Australia
2000s English-language films
Films directed by Jeremy Sims
2000s Australian films